The Stone Arch Bridge is a stone arch railroad bridge in Keene, New Hampshire, United States. Built in 1847 to carry the Cheshire Railroad, it is one of the best-preserved pre-1850 stone arch bridges in the nation. The bridge was listed on the National Register of Historic Places in 2012, and the New Hampshire State Register of Historic Places in 2006. It now carries a multi-purpose rail trail.

Description and history
The Cheshire Railroad Stone Arch Bridge is located in southeastern Keene, in what is today a comparatively rural setting. Its central feature is a massive granite arch, spanning the river known as The Branch. The arch is buttressed by broad wing walls, which are, like the arch itself, finished in ashlar granite.

The bridge was built in 1847 by the Cheshire Railroad, which was built to provide service between Fitchburg, Massachusetts, and Bellows Falls, Vermont. The bridge was designed by Lucian Tilton, probably with the assistance of William Scollay Whitwell, both of whom achieved some renown for their railroad engineering and other public works projects. The bridge was one of the largest stone arch bridges in the nation at the time of its construction, and was noted for its finely crafted finish. The line was formally abandoned in 1972, and much of its New Hampshire right of way was acquired by the state in the 1990s. The bridge now carries the multi-use Cheshire Rail Trail.

See also

National Register of Historic Places listings in Cheshire County, New Hampshire
List of bridges on the National Register of Historic Places in New Hampshire

References

Railroad bridges on the National Register of Historic Places in New Hampshire
Bridges completed in 1847
Buildings and structures in Keene, New Hampshire
Bridges in Cheshire County, New Hampshire
1847 establishments in New Hampshire
National Register of Historic Places in Cheshire County, New Hampshire
New Hampshire State Register of Historic Places
Stone arch bridges in the United States